Testican is a type of proteoglycan. Testican-1 is a highly conserved, multidomain proteoglycan that is most prominently expressed in the thalamus of the brain, and is upregulated in activated astroglial cells of the cerebrum. Several functions of this gene product have now been demonstrated in vitro including membrane-type matrix metalloproteinase inhibition, cathepsin L inhibition, and low-affinity calcium binding. The purified gene product has been shown to inhibit cell attachment and neurite extensions in culture. Functions of testican in vivo have yet to be demonstrated in knockout mice or other models. Testican has been shown to carry substantial amounts of chondroitin sulfate as well as other oligosaccharides, but the biological significance of these embellishments is not yet known.

In humans there are three testicans:
 SPOCK1 (Testican 1)
 SPOCK2 (Testican 2)
 SPOCK3 (Testican 3)

Medicinal Roles 
Testican-1 is known to play a role in lapatinib resistance, which is a drug used to treat HER2-positive gastric cancer. Testican-1 is involved in the pathway for this drug, and leads to drug resistance when upregulated. When testican-1 levels are artificially reduced, sensitivity towards lapatinib was once again increased. This shows the potential for future use in combatting drug resistance.

Testican-1 has also shown to be useful when studying sepsis in patients. A study revealed that patients with more advanced sepsis exhibited higher levels of testican-1. This is useful in determining the severity of sepsis in a clinical setting and could allow healthcare professionals to formulate a better treatment plan.

References